Vivencia (experience) may refer to:

 Vivencias (Ana Gabriel album), 1996
 Vivencia (band)
 Vivencias (book), 2001 María Luisa Piraquive
 Vivencias (Yolandita Monge album), 1988
 Vivencias (Marcos Witt album), 2001